Border Guard Forces (abbreviated BGF) are subdivisions of the Tatmadaw (Myanmar Armed Forces) consisting of former insurgent groups in Myanmar under the instruction of Regional Military Commands. The government announced its plan to create Border Guard Forces in April 2009, in the hopes of ending hostilities between the government and insurgent groups leading up to the 2010 general election.

History 
In 2008 the new constitution made it mandatory for insurgent groups to transition into a BGF before the government would agree to engage in peace talks. Following the government announcement on BGFs, the government set a deadline for all insurgent groups to transition into BGFs, and that all ceasefire agreements prior to the deadline would become "null and void". The deadline was originally set to be June 2009, but was delayed five times until September 2010.

In April 2009, Lieutenant General Ye Myint led a government entourage to meet with Kokang, Shan and Wa insurgent groups, to discuss plans to create "collective security" formed by insurgent groups and under the command of the Tatmadaw, which would eventually lead to the creation of the Border Guard Forces. In 2009, four of the insurgent groups, the Democratic Karen Buddhist Army, the Kachin Defence Army (4th Brigade of the KIA), the New Democratic Army - Kachin (NDA-K) and the Pa-O National Organisation/Army (PNO/A), accepted the transition plan's terms and transformed into BGF groups.

On 20 August 2009, Tatmadaw soldiers and recently transitioned BGF groups gathered outside the town of Laukkai, Kokang, in preparation for an attempt to recapture the town from the Myanmar National Democratic Alliance Army (MNDAA), after they refused to transform into a BGF.

The government changed its aggressive stance towards BGFs and ceasefires on 18 August 2011, when then President of Myanmar Thein Sein pledged to "make the ethnic issue a national priority" by offering open dialogue between the government and all insurgent groups, without the BGF requirement.

In 2010, a powerful commander of DKBA Saw Chit Thu accepted the Burma government’s demands to transform itself into the Border Guard Force, under the command of the Tatmadaw and serving as the leader.

Structure 
There are no official government guidelines regarding BGFs, but there are lines in the Burmese constitution that reference them. The following are de facto rules set by the Tatmadaw upon creation of the Border Guard Forces: 
 BGFs may only operate in the area they are assigned by the government
 All members of a BGF are to be paid the same salary as a regular soldier in the Tatmadaw
 Each BGF is to have exactly 326 personnel, 30 of whom are to be regular Tatmadaw soldiers
 Important administrative positions are to be held only by Tatmadaw soldiers

Ranks

References 

Military of Myanmar
Paramilitary organisations based in Myanmar
2009 establishments in Myanmar
Military units and formations established in 2009
Defence agencies of Myanmar